Indomito (D 559) is the second ship of the Impetuoso-class destroyer of the Italian Navy.

Development  
Impetuoso-class were ordered by the Italian Navy in February 1950. They are based on Commandante hull design. This class holds similar characteristics to the Gearing-class destroyers.

Construction and career 
She was laid down on 24 April 1952 and launched on 9 August 1955 by Cantiere navale fratelli Orlando. Commissioned on 23 February 1958 with the hull number D 559 and decommissioned in November 1980.

Gallery

References

External links
 Destroyer Indomito Marina Militare website

Impetuoso-class destroyers
1955 ships